Deputy Chief Minister of Rajasthan as a part of India state government of Rajasthan.

Former Deputy Chief Minister serve as senior advisor to the Chief Minister of Rajasthan.

List of Deputy Chief Ministers

Keys:

See also
 Rajasthan
 Rajasthan Legislative Assembly

References

 
Rajasthan
Rajasthan politics-related lists